Shiv Nath Chak is 1974 batch IPS officer and has been the Director General in Uttar Pradesh Police. He has also worked as Director General in Indian railways. SN Chak retired as Director General of Police working in the capacity of DG (Prosecution) Uttar Pradesh Police on 30 June 2011.

Early life and education 
SN Chak belonged to a very poor family, and used to paste stickers on bidi packets to earn money for his education.

Political & social career 
Chak has actively participated in social activities since 1997.
Chak has published "Samaj Sanjeevani" magazines, journals and a directory of the Khatik community, named "GharDwar". He has organised various conventions, civil services preparatory classes and has also founded "Rashtravadi Khatik Vikas Parishad"..(), later renamed as "Rashtravadi Khatik Vikas Samiti"..() to provide a platform for providing social services to youth. 

He founded Desh Shakti Party, with the motto of upholding The Constitution of India and for political empowerment of SC, ST, OBC and Minorities. The party was registered by National Election Commission of India on 1 June 2012. The party contested general assembly elections in Jharkhand in 2015 and in Uttar Pradesh in 2017 and organised protests, rallies etc. on different political issues. On 12 March, 2019 Chak joined The Bhartiya Janata Party before resigning from the party on 26 April, 2020.

References

External links 

SN Chak KhatikSamaj Profile

Living people
Uttar Pradesh politicians
Bharatiya Janata Party politicians from Uttar Pradesh
1951 births
Director Generals of Uttar Pradesh Police